Sultan Syarif Abdurrahman Stadium is an association football stadium in Pontianak, West Kalimantan, which is also home of Persipon Pontianak. It has a seating capacity of 5,500.

References

Football venues in Indonesia
Sports venues in Indonesia
Buildings and structures in Pontianak